Jordan's Furniture is an American furniture retailer in New England.  There are currently seven retail locations—three in Massachusetts (Avon, Natick, and Reading) and four in other New England states (Nashua, New Hampshire; New Haven, Connecticut; South Portland, Maine, and Warwick, Rhode Island)—plus a warehouse in Taunton, Massachusetts. Since 1999, the company has been owned by Berkshire Hathaway.

History

The company was started by Samuel Tatelman, who sold furniture from a truck for a decade until opening a store in Waltham, Massachusetts in 1928. In 1940, his son Edward joined the business. In 1973, Edward's sons Barry and Eliot took over the business. They stopped advertising on the back page of the Waltham paper and started advertising on radio. The origin of the company's name is uncertain; Barry once said that their grandfather chose the name out of a hat. Samuel Tatelman died in 1979, and Edward Tatelman died in 1980.

In 1983, Barry and Eliot built and opened the Nashua, New Hampshire, location. In 1987, they opened the Avon, Massachusetts, location, creating the largest traffic jam ever recorded on Route 24. Barry and Eliot had to go on the radio to beg people not to come, while customers stood in line for hours waiting for their turn to go into the showroom.

On April 17, 1998, Barry and Eliot opened the then-largest Jordan's Furniture, in Natick, Massachusetts. With  of showroom space and a Mardi Gras/Bourbon Street theme, the location introduced Jordan's to the MetroWest area.

In October 1999, the Tatelman brothers sold the company and its four retail locations to conglomerate Berkshire Hathaway. At the time of the sale, Barry and Eliot said it would enable them to give their children the freedom to choose any career, and would help the Tatelmans to open more stores. Each employee received a financial gift of 50 cents for every hour ever worked at Jordan's. Operationally, Barry and Eliot remained at the helm as integral parts of the company, while still starring in the brand's radio and television commercials.

The Waltham store closed in October 2004, the same month that the Reading, Massachusetts, store opened, becoming the largest of Jordan's locations. It includes a complete showroom, warehouse, dining, and entertainment. In addition, Jordan's opened a  warehouse and office complex in Taunton, Massachusetts.

Barry Tatelman left the company in December 2006, "to pursue other interests" including helping to produce the Broadway show Dirty Rotten Scoundrels.

In December 2015, Jordan's Furniture opened its doors in New Haven, Connecticut, in the building that formerly housed the New Haven Register, with Warren Buffett attending the grand opening. In 2020, the company opened a location at The Maine Mall in South Portland.

Entertainment 
On August 22, 2002, the IMAX theater at Jordan's Furniture in Natick opened its doors to the public. An IMAX theater was also opened at the Jordan's location in Reading in 2004.

A ropes course, branded as "It", is featured at three locations: Reading, New Haven, and South Portland. Each also features a course for children, branded "LittleIt". The company promotes their New Haven location as "the largest indoor ropes course in the world".

The Reading location features "Beantown", which is a "replica of Downtown Boston and its most famous landmarks" made from jelly beans.

The Avon store seasonally features "The Enchanted Village", which was originally displayed by Jordan Marsh at their Downtown Crossing store in Boston; Jordan's purchased it from the City of Boston after the city discontinued displaying it.

, there are dining options within the Jordan's in Avon (Montilio's) and Reading (Fuddruckers).

Defunct
On Mother's Day of 1992, the Motion Odyssey Movie (MOM) opened in the Avon store, after five years of planning and a $2.5 million investment. A theme ride originally produced by George Lucas, its profits were donated to charity. As of 2015, the ride was still operating, although "only during select school vacation weeks and holidays." The ride was later revised and rebranded as "The Polar Express 4-D Experience", last appearing on the company's website in late 2018.

It closed in 2014 and was replaced by the ropes course.

The Warwick location once featured a liquid fireworks show called "Splash", which lasted 15 minutes and featured "over 9,000 water nozzles" along with digital surround sound and "state of the art lasers". It opened in December 2011 and closed on June 18, 2017, due to mechanical problems.

Promotions 
After Barry Tatelman left the company, his brother Eliot remained the public face of the company. He subsequently aligned himself as a sponsor of the Boston Red Sox and Boston Bruins radio and television broadcasts, including various sports-themed promotions.

Monster Deal
As a promotion in 2007, Jordan's offered full rebates on certain pieces of furniture bought between March 7 and April 16—provided the Red Sox won the World Series.  To cover the potential liability, the store took out an insurance policy for approximately $20 million.  On October 28, 2007, the Red Sox beat the Colorado Rockies to win the 2007 World Series, and Jordan's Furniture subsequently wrote checks to an estimated 24,000 qualified customers. 

A customer from Medford, Massachusetts, sued Jordan's Furniture claiming that the promotion was an illegal lottery. The case was dismissed by the Middlesex Superior Court, and then by an appeals court in July 2009.

Monster Sweep
In 2008, in another promotion linked to the Red Sox, Jordan's offered full rebates on certain pieces of furniture. Instead of just winning the World Series, the Red Sox would have to sweep the 2008 World Series, winning four games in a row. The 2008 Red Sox advanced to the postseason, but lost in the American League Championship Series.

Monster Hit
In 2010, in a promotion launched on March 31, anyone buying furniture between April 1 and May 2 would get that furniture for free if a Red Sox player hit a dinner plate-sized baseball on the Jordan's Furniture sign on the outfield wall at Fenway Park between July 15 and the end of the regular season. Jordan's offered 20% off coupons to customers if the image was not hit during the promotional period.  No player hit the target, and no free furniture was awarded.

The Monster Hit promotion was also run in 2011 and 2012, also without any winners.

The Big Check
On September 30, 2011, two days after the Monster Hit promotion ended, Tatelman began a promotion in conjunction with the Boston Bruins' 2011–12 NHL season. The company promised to refund Jordan's customers the purchase price of their furniture if the Bruins successfully defended the Stanley Cup, which they had won the prior season. The Bruins were eliminated from championship contention in the first round of the playoffs, losing to the Washington Capitals in seven games.

The Perfect Game
On April 3, 2013, Tatelman announced a new promotion accompanied by Pedro Martínez, a former star pitcher with the team. If a member of the Red Sox pitching staff threw a perfect game during the final 72 games of the season, the purchase price of qualified purchases would be refunded. The promotion covered purchases made between April 3 and May 5. The 2013 Red Sox season ended without a perfect game being pitched (to date, Cy Young's perfect game in 1904 remains the only one in franchise history).

In 2018, the company offered a similar promotion for a no hitter. Should the Red Sox pitch a no hitter in any of the 64 games scheduled for July 17 through October 1, Jordan's Furniture would refund purchases made between March 28 and May 20. At the time the promotion was run, the most recent no hitter for the Red Sox was pitched by Jon Lester in 2008. The team did not have a no hitter during the 2018 season.

References

External links
Jordan's Furniture website
Berkshire Hathaway website

Berkshire Hathaway
Retail companies established in 1918
Furniture retailers of the United States
IMAX venues
1918 establishments in Massachusetts
Retail companies based in Massachusetts